Naomi Yang (born September 15, 1964) is an American musician, graphic designer, photographer and filmmaker. She was a member of the dreampop band Galaxie 500, psychedelic rock band Magic Hour and is half of the psychedelic folk duo Damon and Naomi. She has also made videos for a wide number of artists including Future Bible Heroes, Waxahatchee and  Julia Holter.

Music
Yang was bassist and occasional vocalist with noted dreampop band Galaxie 500 on all their recordings from 1987 until their split in 1991. She then recorded three albums and toured with the psychedelic rock band Magic Hour. Since Galaxie 500's split she has worked as duo with her partner Damon Krukowski as Damon and Naomi who have collaborated with notable musicians such as the guitarist Michio Kurihara and members of the Japanese rock band Ghost.

Publishing
In 1989 Yang set up the independent book publisher Exact Change with her partner, who specializes in publishing 19th and 20th century avant-garde literature.

Graphic design
Yang has been responsible for designing the covers of all of Exact Changes publications as well as the sleeves of all of Galaxie 500 and Damon & Naomi's releases. She has also done design work for a wide number of clients including The John Cage Trust.

Photography and film
Yang's photographs have been reproduced in a variety of publications including Giant Robot

In 2011 Yang moved into film-making, directing and editing videos for a wide variety of musical artists.

Selected videos
 Meg Baird – “The Finder” (2011, Drag City) 
 Julia Holter – “Our Sorrows” (2012, RVNG Intl.) 
 Future Bible Heroes – “Living, Loving, Partygoing” (2013, Merge Records) 
 Tanya Donelly – “Mass Ave” (2013, American Laundromat)
 Marissa Nadler – “Drive” (2014, Sacred Bones)
 Waxahatchee – “La Loose” (2015, Merge Records)
 MV & EE - "Feel Alright" (2016, Woodsist)
 Heather Trost – “Agistri” (2016, LM Duplication)
 Lee Ranaldo – “New Thing” (2017, Mute Records)
 Steve Gunn – “Vagabond” (2019, Matador Records)

Fortune
In 2013 she directed and edited the short film Fortune which has screened around the world usually accompanied by live accompaniment by Damon & Naomi.

Selected screenings
 Carpenter Center for the Visual Arts, Harvard University (2014)
 Pop Montreal (2014)
 Istanbul Film Festival
 Museum of Pop Culture, Seattle (2017)

Exhibitions
In 2011 The Aviary Gallery in Jamaica Plain, MA presented a solo show of Yang's photography and video. She has also exhibited as part of the gallery's Sound on Sight group exhibition in 2016.

Personal life
Yang's father, the noted landscape photographer John Yang, was born in China, and her mother is American. She was born in New York City and lives in Cambridge, Massachusetts.

Yang graduated from Harvard with a BA with honors from the Visual & Environmental Studies Department in 1986 and then from 1986 to 1989 she studied architecture at Harvard Graduate School of Design.

Yang is the namesake of "Naomi", a song from Neutral Milk Hotel's debut studio album On Avery Island.

Yang is married to drummer and author Damon Krukowski.

References

External links 
 Naomivision
 Damon & Naomi

1964 births
Living people
Alternative rock bass guitarists
American alternative rock musicians
American women rock singers
American rock bass guitarists
Women bass guitarists
Radcliffe College alumni
20th-century American artists
20th-century American women artists
20th-century bass guitarists
20th-century American women singers
21st-century American artists
21st-century American women artists
21st-century American bass guitarists
21st-century American women singers
20th-century American singers
21st-century American singers
American musicians of Chinese descent
American film directors of Chinese descent